Athens 98.4 FM, officially Municipality of Athens Broadcasting Corporation "Athina" is the first non-state radio station to begin broadcasting in Greece in 1987. The station is the forerunner of the municipal radio sector in Greece.

History
The station went on air on May 31, 1987, without a license but backed by then mayor of Athens Miltiadis Evert. The station initially faced many challenges, as a legal framework for private broadcasting was not finalized in Greece until 1989.

The station used to broadcast on 98.4 FM, but moved to 98.3 FM in March 2001 after frequencies in the city of Athens were reassigned. The station also webcasts online and broadcasts via satellite.

The station also operates its website of news in both Greek and English language.

In 2004, it established the foreign-language station Athens International Radio as a spin-off project.

References

External links
Official Website
Athina 98.4 FM – Online webcast

Radio stations in Athens
Municipal radio in Greece
Radio stations established in 1987
English-language mass media in Greece
1987 establishments in Greece